David Bek  (Դավիթ Բեկ Davit Bek) is an 1882 novel by Armenian writer Raffi based on the life of Davit Bek, an early 18th century Armenian nobleman and revolutionary. The novel was the base for David Bek, a 1944 Soviet Armenian film by Hamo Beknazarian, and the opera David Bek composed by Armen Tigranian.

References

1882 novels
Novels by Raffi
Novels set in Armenia
Armenian-language novels
Novels set in the 18th century
Cultural depictions of Davit Bek